Kelly Perkins is an American heart transplant recipient known for climbing mountains to inspire others and promote organ donation. She has set world records as the first ever heart transplant recipient to scale the most famous mountains in the world.

Perkins has selected peaks of many famous mountains, with both personal and  cause related significance, since her heart transplant operation in 1995. A good example is her climb of El Capitan in Yosemite Park, with its natural heart shaped cut-out, where she was recently quoted as saying, "We thought, how great would that be to climb straight through the heart of El Capitan... in a symbolic way we are tugging on the heart strings of people to be educated about organ donation".

Mountains climbed
Some of the mountains Perkins has climbed since her heart transplant operation are:

 Half Dome, California, USA, 1996
 Mt. Whitney, California, USA, 1997
 Mount Fuji, Japan, 1998
 Mount Kilimanjaro, Tanzania, 2001
 Matterhorn, Zermatt, Switzerland, 2003
 Aspiring, National Park, New Zealand, 2005
 El Capitan, California, USA, 2005
 Cajon de Arenales, Argentina, 2007
 Half Dome, California, USA, 2008
 Teton Range, Wyoming 2009

Commercialization
Perkins and her husband Craig founded HydraCoach, Inc. in 1999 that helps athletes, medical professionals and health/diet conscious individuals adhere to their personal hydration needs, a problem Perkins experienced during one of her climbs.

Perkins memoir, "The Climb of My Life," details her life before her heart transplant operation, and her work and mountain climbs since. Publishers Weekly wrote "Perkins's engaging tale provides valuable inspiration for others struggling to return to an active life after a dire illness." 
The former president of the American Heart Association, Dr. Donald Harrison, said Perkins' biography is "a gripping story" that "many will enjoy . . . particularly patients, relatives, and friends who are experiencing the ravages of heart disease--giving them hope.

References

External links
Profile of Perkins from USA Today by the Associated Press.
Dr. Oz program interview
Interview on ABC News' Good Morning America Now.
Interview on DarynKagan.com by Daryn Kagan
Gayle King interviews Perkins and her husband Craig on Oprah & Friends
 New York Times interview with Perkins
Feature in MSN Lifestyle section "10 Amazing Women"
Oprah Selects Favorite books and "must haves" from Oprah Winfrey programs
Interview by Vicki St. Clair interview with Perkins about her book (Podcast format).
"Both Sides" Column 2008 profile about Perkins' inspiring life
President's Council on Physical Fitness
Associated Press Profile of Perkins after 2001 Mount Kilimanjaro climb
Associated Press profile of Perkins after 1997 Mount Whitney climb

Heart transplant recipients
Living people
Year of birth missing (living people)